Football West National Training Centre, simply known as FW NTC, is a soccer academy based in Perth, Western Australia.

History
The academy was established by Football West in conjunction with FFA and the WA Department of Sport and Recreation in 2006 to operate as an establishment where young players could be assisted to prepare for the game at the highest level.

The boys' team played in the Football West State League in 2012 and 2013, however did not play for points. They also participated in the FFA State Institute Challenge.
The boys' program was replaced by the Perth Glory NPL program in 2014.

Notable male academy graduates

Women's team
The FW NTC Women's team are one of the inaugural teams in the new National Premier Leagues WA Women competition (which commenced in 2020), and is a part of the National Premier Leagues Women’s structure. Previously they had been a part of the Women's Premier League competition (2018–2019); prior to that, they were a part of the Women's State League Premier Division (since at least 2008).

Current women's squad

References

Soccer clubs in Western Australia
Association football clubs established in 2006
2006 establishments in Australia
Defunct soccer clubs in Australia